The Petroleum Museum is a museum in Canada Hill, Miri, Sarawak, Malaysia.

History 
The area where the museum is located was the first oil exploration in Miri which used the Grand Oil Lady drilling rig. It produced oil starting from 22 December 1910 to 1972. One year after retirement on 1 October 1973, the Sarawak Shell Bhd handed over the property to Sarawak State Government in a simple ceremony. Four months after the handover ceremony, a bush fire occurred on the rig but was later extinguished quickly.

Now the area no longer produces oil and has been declared as a protected historical site by Sarawak State Government. The museum was officially opened to the public on 20 May 2005 after it was financed by Shell Malaysia and Petronas.

Exhibition 
The museum showcases various exhibits relating to history of petroleum industry in Malaysia. Inside the museum there are earthquake simulator, oil rig models etc. Outside the museum building is the Grand Old Lady oil rig. The former oil rig stands 30 meters tall.

See also 
 List of museums in Malaysia
 Mining in Malaysia

References

External links 

2005 establishments in Malaysia
Miri, Malaysia
Museums established in 2005
Museums in Sarawak
Petroleum museums